Martin Johannes Sichert (born 10 June 1980) is a German merchant and politician (AfD). He has been a member for his party in the 19th Bundestag and since 25 November 2017 its Bavarian state chairman. Sichert was born in Nuremberg, and completed his studies as a business graduate at the University of Erlangen-Nuremberg in 2006. He worked in Regensburg for more than seven years. At the beginning of the millennium he was a member of the Young Liberals. Martin Sichert has been chairman of the AfD district association Nuremberg / Schwabach and was 2017 direct candidate in the constituency Nuremberg North. From 2017 to 2019 he was State Chairman of the AfD Bayern.

References

External links
 Martin Sichert, AfD, bundestag.de

1980 births
Living people
Members of the Bundestag for Bavaria
Businesspeople from Nuremberg
University of Erlangen-Nuremberg alumni
Members of the Bundestag 2017–2021
Members of the Bundestag 2021–2025
Members of the Bundestag for the Alternative for Germany
Politicians from Nuremberg